Laura María Agustín is an anthropologist who studies undocumented migration, informal labor markets, trafficking, and the sex industry. Blogging and speaking publicly as the Naked Anthropologist, she is critical of the conflation of the terms "human trafficking" and "prostitution". She argues that what she calls the "rescue industry" often ascribes victim status to people (most often women) who have made conscious and rational decisions to migrate knowing they will be selling sex, and who do not consider themselves to be victims. She states that such views on prostitution originate in what she calls "fundamentalist feminism". She advocates for a cultural study of commercial sex, a theoretical framework she created in the journal Sexualities in 2005. 

Agustín carried out research on migration and sex work on the Mexico/US Border, in the Caribbean, in South America, and in several European countries. She did participatory research for several years with a range of social actors aiming to help migrants in Spain. She received a Ph.D. in Cultural Studies and Sociology from the Open University, United Kingdom, in 2004, with Tony Bennett as her supervisor.

Her first book, Trabajar en la industria del sexo, y otros tópicos migratorios, was published in Spain in 2004 (Gakoa). In 2007, she published her second book, Sex at the Margins: Migration, Labour Markets and the Rescue Industry (Zed Books). In this book, she argued that contemporary anti-trafficking "crusades" have the effect of restricting international freedom of movement, and she compared today's anti-trafficking feminists with the "bourgeois women" of the 19th century who felt the need to save poor prostitutes, seeing women as weak, easily victimized, and in need of guidance. Agustín does not deny human trafficking or forced prostitution takes place, but, rather, argues that the campaigners against prostitution and undocumented migration over-estimate figures.

Agustín publishes in Spanish, English, and Swedish. In 2010, she was Visiting Professor in Gender and Migration in the Swiss university system, based at the University of Neuchatel, and participated in the Battle of Ideas in London.

References

External links
 Website and Blog of Laura Agustín - the Naked Anthropologist, with list of publications
 Guardian Profile
 The Sex in Sex Trafficking by Laura Agustín, in American Sexuality, 28 November 2007
 The Shadowy World of Sex Across Borders by Laura Agustín, in The Guardian, 19 November 2008
 Border Thinking by Laura Agustín, in Re-public, June 2008]
 Radio interview with Agustin, 15 November 2007
 Review of Trabajar en la industria del sexo 
 Podcast of lecture - Sex at the Margins: Migration, Labour Markets and the Rescue Industry
 Reviews of Sex at the Margins
 The myth of trafficking, New Statesman, 27 March 2008
 Exploding the myth of trafficking, Spiked Review of Books, April 2008
 All You Need To Know About Sex Trafficking, Harriet , The Erotic Review, issue 86, February 2008

Living people
Sex worker activists
Sex industry researchers
Year of birth missing (living people)